Tudor Hall School is a private day and boarding school for girls in Oxfordshire, situated between Bloxham and Banbury. It was founded by a Baptist Minister and his wife, and moved to several different places before the purchase of its current premises after the Second World War.

History
Tudor Hall was founded in 1850 in Salisbury, by the Rev.John Wood Todd and his wife Martha, and moved to the Forest Hill area of London in around 1854, initially at Perry Hill House, and later at Red Hall, or Tudor House, from which the school's name emerged.

By the 1900s, the school had expanded and was in need of more space. In 1908, it moved to Chislehurst in Kent. The school later went through difficult times and had to be closed down for a term in 1935. Former pupil Nesta Inglis, elder daughter of banker and Marylebone Cricket Club amateur cricketer Alfred Inglis, took over as headmistress and re
opened the school.

At the outbreak of World War II, the school relocated to Burnt Norton, near Chipping Campden, Gloucestershire, to escape the air raids. However, it outgrew the property during the war. Inglis came across some land outside Banbury, Oxfordshire, and the purchase was made in February 1944. The school moved to the new location in January 1946.

Boarding
Tudor Hall offers a full boarding programme. Over two thirds of pupils are boarders. New boarders are usually assigned an older girl to assist them with adjustment into boarding life. There are full-time residential staff who live on-campus.

Houses
Upon entry each girl is assigned to a house, each of which is named after one of the Royal Houses that ruled over England.

Tudor
Stuart
Lancaster
York

Traditions
Unlike many schools, Tudor Hall uses an unusual nomenclature for its year groups.

Todd/Ones - Year 7
Twos - Year 8
Threes - Year 9
Fours - Year 10
Fives - Year 11
Inglis - Year 12
Ashtons - Year 13

Notable old girls
Former pupils are known as "Old Tudorians"
 Beatrice Offor, artist
 Annabel Heseltine, journalist and broadcaster
 Serena Armitage, Academy Award Winner for Best Short Film ‘Stutterer’
 Julia Peyton-Jones, former Director of Serpentine Gallery & winner of Lifetime Achievement Award at Women of the World festival
 Patsy Seddon, British womenswear designer who founded clothing brand Phase Eight
 Nichola Pease, British Fund Manager
 Monica Vinader, Founder and Creative Director of British jewellery brand Monica Vinader
 Francesca Cumani, ITV Presenter, horse racing
Lady Margarita Armstrong-Jones, granddaughter of Princess Margaret and greatniece of Queen Elizabeth II

References

External links
 School Website
 Profile on the ISC website
 ISI Inspection Report
 Profile on MyDaughter

Boarding schools in Oxfordshire
1850 establishments in England
Girls' schools in Oxfordshire
Private schools in Oxfordshire
Member schools of the Girls' Schools Association
Educational institutions established in 1850